Henry Basil Turner (8 July 1905 – 19 September 1988) was an Australian politician. Born in Woolwich, New South Wales to metallurgist Basil William Turner and Mabel Lily, née Breillat, he attended Malvern School in Sydney, and then the University of Sydney and Cambridge University. In 1930 he became a barrister. He married Mildred Mary Raymond at Mosman on 4 July 1931; they were to have three daughters and a son.

In 1937, he was elected to the New South Wales Legislative Assembly for the seat of Gordon, representing the United Australia Party. He held the seat until 1952, during which time the United Australia Party became the Liberal Party. He was on military service 1940–44. In 1952, following the death of Billy Hughes, Turner successfully contested the resulting by-election for the federal seat of Bradfield. He held the seat until his retirement in 1974; during that time he was often a delegate to overseas conventions, including the United Nations in 1963. He died in 1988 at Killara.

References

 

United Australia Party members of the Parliament of New South Wales
Liberal Party of Australia members of the Parliament of New South Wales
Members of the Australian House of Representatives for Bradfield
Members of the Australian House of Representatives
1905 births
1988 deaths
Liberal Party of Australia members of the Parliament of Australia
20th-century Australian politicians
Members of the New South Wales Legislative Assembly